Spooks: Code 9 (working titles – Rogue Spooks and Spooks: Liberty) is a counter-intelligence drama series broadcast on BBC Three in 2008.

The series was commissioned by BBC Fiction's controller Jane Tranter as a spin-off of their long-running drama Spooks, offering a "more maverick, younger perspective" that would attract a 16–24-year-old audience. The series follows a group of six new young MI5 recruits who "follow a different rule book". It was produced by the independent production company Kudos and was filmed in and around Leeds and Bradford. The first two episodes were broadcast on BBC Three on 10 August 2008 and repeated on the same channel on 11 August 2008.

The decision to relate the new project to the original Spooks was controversial, with actor Georgia Tennant saying "it's slightly misleading in terms of the word Spooks." and producer Chris Fry saying "this is a completely new show. There are no crossover characters or storylines and, most importantly, it is set in a completely new world." After the first series ended relatively unsuccessfully (with an audience of 245,000 for the series finale) executive producer Karen Wilson claimed that many of the existing cast members were "contracted for another year" and outlined themes "we'd like to explore if we get a second series." However, due to low ratings and damning reviews, a second series was never commissioned.

Plot 
The series begins in 2012 (just after the 2012 Summer Olympics), when London and some of the south east has been evacuated in the wake of a nuclear attack during the opening ceremony of the Games. The government has relocated to Manchester; Thames House has been decommissioned, and MI5 is forced to set up offices across the UK in an attempt to help the country avoid new attacks.

Cast
 Charlie Green (Liam Boyle) – an ex-mathematician who leads the team on an interim basis after the assassination of Hannah in the first episode. He gained the job after he stood up to Field Operations Director Sarah Yates (Lorraine Burroughs).
 Rachel Harris (Ruta Gedmintas) – a former police officer.
 Vik Kamath (Christopher Simpson) – an entrepreneur.
 Kylie Roman (Georgia Moffett) – a former psychology student.
 Rob Sullivan (Andrew Knott) – formerly a doctor, and now the team medic.
 Jez Cook (Heshima Thompson) – a reformed criminal.
 Sarah Yates (Lorraine Burroughs) – formerly head of operations for MI5
 Saeed Khan (Parvez Qadir) – director-general of MI6

Marketing

The series was heavily promoted across the BBC channels, through conventional outdoor marketing and a viral marketing campaign by Agency Republic. As one of BBC Three's multi-platform programmes, there was also a heavy digital element, including streaming the programme live on the site simultaneously with its TV broadcast.

An experiential site called Facespook was launched in July 2008, which uses flash-based face-mapping to add 'you' into the video action. The story branches depending on choices you make.

Further interaction was through the extended reality site Liberty News, a 2013 news site created by online agency Six to Start. Offering relevant news stories associated with the episodes, the site was updated live during the programme with stories related to the on-screen action; the site encouraged role-play as though you were part of the in-series world to explore the issues raised.  Following the last episode of the series, the site ran a live chat with characters representing various organisations relevant to the storylines. During this chat, the site was raided and the news organisation 'closed down'. The Liberty News site has since been archived.

Episodes
Spooks Code 9 consists of six episodes. The series began on 10 August 2008.

Reception

Audience
The first episode of the series had (estimated) 810,000 viewers for a multichannel share of 3.8%, with the second episode (broadcast immediately after the first) having 703,000 viewers and 4.0% share. The third episode (broadcast a week later) attracted 447,000 viewers and 2.1% multichannel share, having "lost nearly half of its audience last night, 17 August, compared with last Sunday's launch." The fourth episode, broadcast on 24 August, attracted 288,000 viewers and 1.4% multichannel share, the fifth (31 August) having 353,000 viewers, and the sixth (7 September) 245,000.

Reviews
For The Times reviewer Andrew Billen said the series "fancies itself as gritty and hip" and that it was "to Spooks what Torchwood is to Doctor Who (ie, not as good)", adding criticism of what he saw as its low budget, its combination of "state torture with a boozy, flirty This Life house-share", and its failure of nerve in not fully linking the attack "with either the Olympics or al-Qaeda". Roland White in The Sunday Times concluded "The script is poor and the acting little better. It's like watching recent graduates takes their first management-training exercise."

A preliminary piece in The Daily Telegraph wondered if the series could avoid accusations of trying to cash in on Spooks despite being "a spin-off with almost nothing in common with its namesake", whilst other reviews in the same paper called the general scenario "daft and unconvincing" and too ludicrous to work as well as similar spin-offs. Though the Telegraph did find some praise for the "surprising twist" in the first episode, it lampooned the nuclear attack for having seemingly "killed everyone over the age of 40" and left MI5 "staffed purely by the young and good-looking", comparing the series' youthful cast with that of Skins.

Internet reception by fans of the original Spooks was generally negative, largely due to the absence of any reference to the events of the main series. A review of the first episode by website Digital Spy found the show "utterly uninspired and stale", "shambolically written", "patronising", and "amateurish". The second episode "is certainly an improvement on the dire opener, although that's hardly a compliment." But "the entire show comes across as one of those school teachers who tries desperately to be trendy and get down wiv da kidz" and "has yet to show ...that it can transcend its current status as a piece of condescending, uninvolving tripe." However, by the sixth episode Digital Spy had detected a "stark improvement in the latter half of the first season", saying the finale "summed up the uneven nature of the season, but ultimately delivered a reasonably absorbing glimpse of a claustrophobic and panic-strewn future" that "leaves us wanting more...." But "was the budget being saved up for the grand finale? If so, that's a dodgy move indeed as ratings have shown that not many viewers have stuck around."

The Guardian described it as "a spin-off too far", with "clunky, lazy writing", "ropey indeed.... an utterly cynical venture and a damning indictment of the lack of imagination at work in commissioning new drama," going on to say that "given its patronising awfulness, SC9 actually damages the Spooks brand." Discussing The Guardian's opinion a year later, Adrian Hon (who was responsible for the Liberty News website) said "the branding plan had backfired" and if it had been launched with "a different name (i.e. not Spooks), everyone would have given the show more of a chance." In his opinion "they got it backwards": the first two episodes being "equally painful to watch", later episodes improved and episode six "really quite entertaining. In fact, the first minutes of the finale are captivating.... That's how SC9 should've started."

References

External links 
 
 

2000s British drama television series
2008 British television series debuts
2008 British television series endings
BBC television dramas
Espionage television series
Spooks (TV series)
British television spin-offs
Terrorism in television
MI5 in fiction
Television series set in 2012
Television series set in 2013